The Tercera División de Futsal, formerly known as Primera Nacional B is the fourth futsal pyramid in Spain. It was founded in 1990 and is managed by Football Federation of every autonomous community. The Tercera División is an amateur level.

The Tercera División de Futsal consists in 23 groups. Every group corresponds to one or two Spanish regions. There are in total 337 approx. teams. Every group champion and the best four qualified teams are promoted to Segunda División B. Conversely, the bottom two or three teams of every group are relegated to Regional leagues.

Since 2011–12' season onwards, Primera Nacional B is known as Tercera División.

Groups and teams (2013–14 season)

Group 1 (Catalonia)

Group 2 (Catalonia)

Group 3 (Madrid)

Group 4 (Madrid)

Group 5 (Asturias)

Group 6 (Basque Country)

Group 7 (Navarre)

Group 8 (Galicia)

Group 9 (Castile and León)

Group 10 (Aragon)

Group 11 (Las Palmas)
Removed for 2012–13 season.

Group 12 (Tenerife)

Group 13 (Murcia)

Group 14 (Castellón & Valencia)

Group 15 (Alicante)

Group 16 (Castile-La Mancha)

Group 17 (Western Andalusia)

Group 18 (Eastern Andalusia)

Group 19 (Balearic Islands)

Group 20 (La Rioja)

Group 21 (Cantabria)

Group 22 (Castile-La Mancha) 
Removed for 2012–13 season.

Group 23 (Extremadura)

References

External links
LNFS website
RFEF website

4